Ernest Anderson may refer to:

 Ernest Anderson (bishop) (1859–1945), Anglican bishop of Riverina, New South Wales, Australia
 Ernest Anderson (American football) (born 1960), former American football running back
 Ernest P. Anderson (1897–1955), American businessman and politician
 Ernest Anderson (Minnesota politician) (1902–1992), American farmer and politician
 Ernest Masson Anderson (1877–1960), Scottish geologist
 Ernest Anderson (actor), American film actor 
Ernie Anderson (1923–1997), American voice actor 
 Ernie Anderson (ice hockey) (1898–1977), Canadian ice hockey player
 Ernest Anderson (footballer) (1877–1943), Australian rules footballer
 Ernest Anderson III, American jazz guitarist and bassist